Bengal Solar Plant is a photovoltaic power station with a total capacity of 10MWp, it is located in West Bengal.

Overview 
Risen Energy supplied 1500V 275Wp polysilicon modules to this project

References

External Links 

 Interactive scholarly application, multimodal resources mashup (publications, images, videos)

Photovoltaic power stations in India
Energy infrastructure completed in 2019
2019 establishments in West Bengal